Staurastrum is a genus of green algae, specifically of the Desmidiaceae.

Species

 S. affine
 S. alternans
 S. arctiscon
 S. asteroideum
 S. avicula
 S. brachiatum
 S. brachycerum
 S. brebissonii
 S. capitulum
 S. cerastes
 S. clepsydra
 S. crenulatum
 S. cristatum
 S. cyclacanthum
 S. dejectum
 S. dickiei
 S. dilatatum
 S. dispar
 S. galeatum
 S. gemelliparum
 S. gracile
 S. hantzschii
 S. hexacerum
 S. hirsutum
 S. iotanum
 S. isthmosum
 S. javanicum
 S. laeve
 S. lapponicum
 S. lunatum
 S. maamense
 S. majusculum
 S. margaritaceum
 S. monticulosum
 S. muticum
 S. natator
 S. omaerii
 S. ophiura
 S. orbiculare
 S. paradoxum
 S. pingue
 S. polymorphum
 S. pseudotetracerum
 S. punctulatum
 S. pyramidatum
 S. quadricornutum
 S. sebaldi
 S. simonyi
 S. sp. BBM-2004
 S. sp. desmid10
 S. sp. M752
 S. sp. M753
 S. spongiosum
 S. subavicula
 S. subgemmulatum
 S. thunmarkii
 S. tumidum

References

External links

Scientific references

Scientific databases

 
 AlgaTerra database
 Index Nominum Genericorum

Desmidiaceae
Charophyta genera